Witanów railway station is a railway station in Witanów, Poland. The station is served by Koleje Mazowieckie, who run trains from Kutno to Warszawa Wschodnia.

References
Station article at kolej.one.pl

Railway stations in Masovian Voivodeship
Railway stations served by Koleje Mazowieckie
Warsaw West County